The  is the common name of the western portion of the Kansai Main Line. The line is owned and operated by West Japan Railway Company (JR West), and starts at Kamo Station in Kyoto Prefecture and ends at JR Namba Station in Naniwa-ku, Osaka.

Operations

Yamatoji Rapid Service 

Trains divert from the Kansai Line at Shin-Imamiya Station instead of continuing to JR Namba. From Shin-Imamiya, they run on the Osaka Loop Line, making limited stops to Osaka Station, and then making every stop before completing the loop at Tennoji Station. However, some services do not complete the loop, as they terminate in Kyobashi.
Some weekend services operate through service to the Wakayama Line towards Takada and Gojō.
All trains are operated using 221 series EMUs, with every of them being 8 cars.

Regional Rapid Service 

 operate the same route as the Yamatoji Rapid but making every stop on the Osaka Loop Line. They are operated in weekday rush hours, plus weekend nights. There are also services which operate through services to the Wakayama Line. All services are operated using 221 series EMUs.

Rapid Service 

" operate between JR Namba and either Takada on the Wakayama Line (daytime), or Nara / Kamo (morning, evening, night), with an interval of 2 trains per hour. Among the through trains towards the Wakayama Line during the evening rush, some of them are coupled with Nara-bound services before decoupling at Ōji. However there are no Namba-bound services where two trains couple at Ōji. Additionally, there are a few Namba-bound through service trains starting from Nara and detours the Sakurai Line in the morning rush.
Trains stop at JR Namba, Shin-Imamiya, Tennoji,  and every station after Ōji.
During daytime, trains are operated using 4-car 221 series EMUs. During rush hours, 6-car 201 series EMUs are also used, but now there is a higher tendency that 221 series trains are used.  From the timetable revision on 15 March 2008 until 11 March 2022, 3 Rapid services starting from Kashiwara (where Rapid trains normally skip) to Namba were operated.

The operation of the "Direct Rapid Service" trains started on March 17, 2008, with the opening of the Osaka Higashi Line and the timetable revision on March 15, 2008. On weekdays, 4 Shin-Osaka-bound trains are operated in the mornings, while 4 Nara-bound trains are operated in the evenings. On weekends, 2 round trips are operated both in the mornings and in the evenings. Trains are operated using 207 series or 321 series EMUs from the Aboshi Depot.
Before 16 March 2019, when the Osaka Higashi Line still hadn't extended to Shin-Osaka, Direct Rapid trains operated between Nara and  via the Yamatoji Line, the Osaka Higashi Line, the Katamachi Line (Gakkentoshi Line), and the JR Tōzai Line.

"Local trains" stop at every station on the Yamatoji Line between Kamo and JR Namba. They are operated between Oji and JR Namba in the non-rush hour. Trains are also operated from JR Namba to Kamo and through from JR Namba to the Nara Line in the early morning.

History
The name "Yamatoji Line" has been used since March 13, 1988, and the term “Yamatoji“ roughly translates to “Road to Yamato Province”.

Station numbering was introduced in March 2018 with the Yamatoji Line being assigned station numbers between JR-Q17 and JR-Q39 with the exception of JR-Q35 (which will be assigned to a future station between Koriyama and Nara).

Stations
● : All trains stop.
| : All trains pass.

Local trains stop at every passenger station.

Rolling stock
 201 series (Rapid and Local services, until 2023)
 207 series (Direct Rapid services)
 221 series (Yamatoji Rapid, Rapid and Local services)
 321 series (Direct Rapid services)

Former
 103 series (until 2018)
 105 series (until 1994)
 113 series (until July 1989)
 117 series
 205 series (until March 2022)
 223-0/2500 series (Kansai Airport/Kishuji Rapid service, until March 2008)
 223-6000 series (Direct Rapid service, until March 2011)
 381 series (Yamatoji Liner Rapid service, until March 2011)

References

Rail transport in Osaka Prefecture
Lines of West Japan Railway Company
1067 mm gauge railways in Japan
Railway lines opened in 1988
1988 establishments in Japan